The following is a list of presidents of the cable television network Cartoon Network.

Betty Cohen (1992–2001)

Betty Cohen became the first president of Cartoon Network in 1992, a position she held until her resignation in 2001. Cohen had previously worked as the manager of marketing for the Cable Health Network in 1982 and as the director of on-air promotion and interstitial programming for Nickelodeon from 1984 to 1988. Under Cohen's leadership, Cartoon Network became a global phenomenon with asset value of nearly $3 billion. Cohen stepped down from her post on June 18, 2001, stating "I was afraid I would die the queen of cartoons." She was succeeded by Jim Samples.

Under Cohen's watch, network brands such as Toonami, the Cartoon Cartoons, Cartoon Cartoon Fridays, and Cartoon Orbit were introduced, as well as original series such as Space Ghost Coast to Coast, What a Cartoon!, Dexter's Laboratory, Johnny Bravo, Cow and Chicken, The Powerpuff Girls, Ed, Edd n Eddy, and Courage the Cowardly Dog. Dexter's Laboratory, in particular, was one of her favorite animated shows.

Jim Samples (2001–2007)

On August 22, 2001, Jim Samples was promoted to Executive Vice President and General Manager of Cartoon Network Worldwide, replacing founder and original president Betty Cohen. Under Samples's leadership, the network included successful original series such as Samurai Jack, Codename: Kids Next Door, The Grim Adventures of Billy & Mandy, Star Wars: Clone Wars, Teen Titans, Foster's Home for Imaginary Friends, Camp Lazlo, Ben 10, and Class of 3000. He is also credited with the rollout and launch of Adult Swim, the leading late-night network for young men in the United States, and joined forces with 20th Century Fox to put Family Guy back into production as the anchor for the Adult Swim line-up before leaving Adult Swim in 2021.

Under Samples's leadership, Cartoon Network also somewhat controversially began airing live-action "cartoon-inspired" movies in 2005, such as The Goonies and Who Framed Roger Rabbit; this move was made in response to CN's slumping ratings due to competing live-action shows on Nickelodeon and Disney Channel. In 2006, the network produced their first live-action original movie, Re-Animated, a collaboration between live-action and animation. When asked about the project, Samples stated "We think when it's done the 'Cartoon Network' way, kids will enjoy seeing animation and the real world collide." While Cartoon Network intended to produce future shows that blend live-action with animation as well as "cartoony" live-action shows, Samples maintained "we're predominately an animated network and that's not changing anytime soon."

Samples resigned from his post on February 9, 2007, following a bomb scare in Boston caused by packages left around the city that were part of an outdoor marketing campaign promoting the Adult Swim series Aqua Teen Hunger Force. On May 2, Stuart Snyder was named Samples' successor.

Stuart Snyder (2007–2014)

As previously mentioned, Jim Samples resigned from Cartoon Network on February 9, 2007, following a bomb scare in Boston caused by packages left around the city that were part of an outdoor marketing campaign promoting the Adult Swim series Aqua Teen Hunger Force. Samples made the decision "in recognition of the gravity of the situation that occurred under my watch", and with the "hope that my decision allows us to put this chapter behind us and get back to our mission of delivering unrivaled original animated entertainment for consumers of all ages". Following Samples's resignation, Stuart Snyder was named his successor three months later on May 2, 2007. On September 14, the network's look was revamped, with bumpers and station IDs themed to The Hives song "Fall is Just Something That Grown-Ups Invented." 2007 saw the debut of Out of Jimmy's Head, a spin-off of the movie Re-Animated, and the first live-action Cartoon Network series. 2007 also saw the debut of the series Chowder. In late 2007, The network began broadcasting programs from Canadian channels such as YTV and Teletoon, including George of the Jungle, 6teen, Storm Hawks, League of Super Evil, Chaotic, Bakugan Battle Brawlers, Stoked, and the Total Drama series. Each October from 2007 to 2009, Cartoon Network also re-ran 40 episodes of the former Fox Kids series Goosebumps.

In June 2009, Cartoon Network introduced a block of live-action reality shows called "CN Real", featuring programs such as The Othersiders, Survive This, BrainRush, Destroy Build Destroy, Dude, What Would Happen and Bobb'e Says. The network also aired some limited sports programming, including basketball recaps and Slamball games, during commercial breaks. The lineup was universally panned for being live-action shows on a channel dedicated to cartoons, competing against Nickelodeon & Disney Channel. That year, it also started airing live-action feature films from Warner Bros. and New Line Cinema.

On March 6, 2014, Stuart Snyder was removed as president and COO of Turner's Animation, Young Adults & Kids Media division after a restructure. On July 16, Christina Miller was named his successor as president and general manager of Cartoon Network, Adult Swim, and Boomerang. At the end of the month, Cartoon Network's 8 pm ET/PT primetime hour was given to its night time block Adult Swim, causing new episodes of the network's programming to change timeslots. On October 21, 2014, Cartoon Network, along with CNN and Boomerang, were taken off-air from US-based TV provider, Dish Network, due to contract disagreements. However, the channels were restored a month later.

Christina Miller (2014–2019)

On July 16, Christina Miller was named his successor as president and general manager of Cartoon Network, Adult Swim, and Boomerang. At the end of the month, Cartoon Network's 8 pm ET/PT primetime hour was given to its night time block Adult Swim, causing new episodes of the network's programming to change timeslots. On October 21, 2014, Cartoon Network, along with CNN and Boomerang, were taken off-air from US-based TV provider, Dish Network, due to contract disagreements. However, the channels were restored a month later.

On November 27, 2019, it was announced that Christina Miller would be leaving WarnerMedia at the end of 2019. Michael Ouweleen will be serving as interim president of Cartoon Network, with Miller helping with the transition.

Michael Ouweleen (2019–2020, 2022–present)

Original position roles 
In 2014, Ouweleen was named CMO of Cartoon Network, Adult Swim, and Boomerang at Turner Broadcasting System. In January 2020, Ouweleen became the interim President of Cartoon Network, Adult Swim, and Boomerang due to the departure of Christina Miller. After Tom Ascheim took over the role in July 2020, Ouweleen became the President of Adult Swim, reporting to Ascheim.

Tom Ascheim (2020–2022) 
Ascheim acted as the president of Freeform until April 2020, when he stepped down to take the position of president of Warner Bros. Global Kids, Young Adults and Classics, a division which had oversight over Cartoon Network, Cartoon Network Studios, Warner Bros. Animation and Turner Classic Movies; his first day at the position was July 1. In May 2022, following company-wide reorganizations after the Warner Bros. Discovery merger, Tom Ascheim's role was eliminated.

Return to Cartoon Network 

Once Ascheim's left following reorganizations of the Warner Bros. Discovery merger, Ouweleen became President of Cartoon Network and Boomerang once again in May 2022.

See also
List of programs broadcast by Cartoon Network

References

 
Presidents